Mikaël Brageot is an aerobatics pilot, who competes in the Red Bull Air Race. He was the youngest ever pilot to fly for the French national aerobatic team and has won European championships.

Results

Red Bull Air Race

Challenger Class

Master Class

Gallery

References

External links

 Breitling Racing Team

1987 births
Living people
French aviators
French air racers
Red Bull Air Race World Championship pilots